Perunchani Dam is an irrigation dam at Perunchani, in Kalkulam Taluk, Kanyakumari District, in the state of Tamil Nadu, India. It is one of the dams of the Kodayar Irrigation System. As there was water deficiency in the Kodayar Irrigation System, Perunchani Dam was constructed in December 1952 to store flood water of the Paralayar River as an extension. The irrigation system became operational on 2 September 1953. It feeds the left bank irrigation canal system of the Puthen dam, which is the terminal structure of the system.

Topography
The dam is built between two hillocks (part of the Western Ghats) across the Paralayar River, a tributary of the Tamaraparani River, also known locally as the Kuzhithuraiar, and is part of the basin that constitutes the west-flowing rivers from Tadri to Kanyakumari. Tamaraparani River rises in the Western Ghats and flows through a distance of  before debouching into the Arabian Sea. The reservoir is thickly forested and inhabited by wild animals such as tiger, elephants, and deer. The tribal community of Kanikars resides around the periphery of the reservoir. 
 

Water resources

Features
The dam was constructed between 1948 and 1953 by the then State of Travancore-Cochin. There are four spillway gate openings, each  in size. The project lies in Seismic Zone-III. The dam is provided with drainage gallery of  length in the central section of the river. It serves the purpose of collecting seepage water from the foundation of the dam and also as an inspection gallery, and measures .

The fishing operation in the reservoir is limited to the indigenous Puntus spp.

Irrigation system

The irrigation system consists of four dams and associated storage reservoirs, anicuts, and canal system. The first project to be implemented under this system was the Pechiparai dam, built during 1948–53; the Kodiyar Left Bank Canal (KLBC) taking off from this dam feeds the Puthen dam, which is a weir that was remodeled under World Bank assistance during the 2000s. The next two dams to be built were the Chittar dam I and Chittar dam II in the period from 1964 to 1970; the storage waters of these two reservoirs were also fed into the KLBC. The storage from the Perunchani reservoir is also fed into the Puthen weir.

References

Bibliography

 

Dams in Tamil Nadu
Buildings and structures in Kanyakumari district
Masonry dams

Hydroelectric power stations in Tamil Nadu
Dams completed in  2005
2005 establishments in Tamil Nadu